Paulo Hugenneyer Kogos (20 May 1986) is a Brazilian youtuber and digital influencer. He is known as an activist of the Brazilian  far right, being one of the most prominent figures in demonstrations against social isolation during the pandemic of COVID-19 and in favor of Jair Bolsonaro.

Personal life
Paulo Kogos is the only son of the gynecologist Waldemar Kogos and Lígia Kogos, one of the best known dermatologists in Brazil, known as the "Queen of Botox", who counts Marcela Temer, Beth Szafir and Amaury Jr. among her clients. Kogos is the owner of Ligia Kogos Dermocosmeticos, a skincare family company , located in Jardins. Kogos claims to have Asperger syndrome, a mild form of autism, but has never been diagnosed.

Education
Kogos is a Brazilian Army reserve communication corps officer trained at São Paulo's Reserve Officer Preparation Center (CPOR-SP) in 2005.

Shortly after completing CPOR, he graduated in business administration from Insper. He also studied postgraduate studies in economics at Mackenzie University.

As in April 2020 he was in his second year of graduation in philosophy, at the faculty of the Monastery of São Bento, in São Paulo.

Political activism
Kogos states that he was always politically active, influenced by his grandfather, always profiling on the right, having even appreciated the military dictatorship.

On November 6, 2020, in an interview with the program Panic, from the station Jovem Pan, he declared himself at the “extreme right wing”, having left neoliberalism and now saying that he is politically anarcho-capitalist.

In an interview with Estadão, he declared himself "anarcho-capitalist with monarchical tendencies", asserting himself against democracy, in which he sees "the loss of moral restraints and ethical limits". He defends an ideal of Christian society, free market, order and hierarchy, based on the principle of social inequality, in which some people are better able than others to serve. Power would thus be exercised by "small governance by a natural elite".

In April 2020, he was viscerally opposed to party politics, denying any interest in running for an election.

In 2020, during the COVID-19 pandemic, he became one of the most prominent figures in demonstrations against social isolation and in favor of Jair Bolsonaro.

Despite João Doria, governor of São Paulo, being a friend of the family, and in the past Kogos having participated in several meetings organized by the governor, called “Family Workshop” and aimed at family businesses, he began to declare himself as a fierce opponent of the governor of São Paulo and the social isolation measures he enacted, promoting an opposition campaign symbolized by the hashtag #ForaDoria, and calling SarsCov-2 "doriavirus".

On April 12, he participated in a demonstration on Paulista Avenue carrying a fake coffin, to symbolize the political wake of Governor João Doria. According to Kogos, the coffin symbolized the political burial of João Doria, Nazism, Communism and what he called 'PSDBismo'.

As a result, he was attacked on social media for considering the gesture to be disrespectful of the tens of thousands of deaths hitherto caused by COVID-19 worldwide. Then a series of videos and photos of Kogos circulated on Twitter in random situations, such as the funeral of Hebe Camargo and the launch of wines by Galvão Bueno.

According to Veja, after an interview on the magazine's website, Kogos was reportedly expelled from Club Athletico Paulistano, the most elitist in Brazil. Kogos denies this information, confirming, however, that he received a verbal warning for being involved in a soccer fan fight in 2016.

In June of the same year, he appeared dressed as a Templar knight in demonstrations on Paulista Avenue against João Doria, in a symbolism framed in the admiration of the far-right for the European Middle Ages and the Templar Crusades.

In September 2020, Kogos did not wear the mask in a shopping mall in São Paulo using the pretext of being eating an ice cream. The media jokingly referred to the act as the "Ice Cream Revolt".

Social media
In 2018, Paulo Kogos' YouTube channel was identified in an academic paper by the Faculty of Social and Human Sciences at Universidade Nova de Lisboa as one of the dominant voices in the ecosystem of populist movements on the Brazilian right on that platform. The use of the Force Atlas 2 algorithm and the metrics Modularity and Weighted Average Grade allowed the detection of an entire community centered on the Kogos channel, inserting itself both in the network dominated by the Movimento Brasil Livre (MBL), as well as in the one dominated by the channel "Ideias Radicais", with a density of users five times higher than that of the network dominated by the Free Brazil Movement, acting as a bridge between the communities of both networks. The channel appears with a high weighted degree in the network dominated by "Ideias Radicais", characterized by the relations of great coherence in the framework of liberalism and anarcho-capitalism.

He was known for the controversial political statements on his YouTube channel, referred to as "Knights Templar" as "West in Fury", which in November 2020 had 126,000 subscribers. Kogos claims to be a Christian, defending the Church and society in his channel against what he calls moral devastation. He claims that Jair Bolsonaro got it right when he appealed against Christophobia in his speech at the 75th UN General Assembly on 22 September, claiming it to be a worldwide problem. He defends separatism, the return of the Inquisition and the Crusades.

Korgos classifies COVID-19 as "a disease little worse than a flu," saying that the World Health Organization "should be militarily extinguished by armed commands." Kogos manifested himself in opposition to social isolation in an energetic way, having thus gained some projection both positive and negative. In April 2020, the video "Against Coronavirus, Let Us Be Politically Incorrect" had over 44,000 views. Kogos has also used his YouTube channel to attack vaccination against COVID-19.

In the Instagram profile picture, he poses with a machine gun in his hand, appearing also characterized as a Templar and Viking warrior, in odes to the Middle Ages, and making arms with his hands.

In April 2020, Kogos had been kicked out of the social network Twitter, which canceled his profile for deeming the content of his posts inappropriate.

Literary references
Kogos appears as a character in the children's book written by Giuliano Miotto, "Anya and the Mystery of the Missing Doggy Galt", published in August 2019, in the role of Kogros the Terrible, "a boy who thought he was an ogre".

References

1986 births
Anarcho-capitalists
Brazilian activists
Brazilian Roman Catholics
Brazilian anti-communists
Brazilian YouTubers
Far-right politics in Brazil
Living people